This is a list of compositions by Guillaume Lekeu.

The list is initially in chronological order of composition completion date. The "V." header is clickable and doing so will sort the list by "V" numbers, which are grouped into genre and other categories, according to the 1993 catalogue by musicologist Luc Verdebout. (To return to the chronological order, reload the webpage.)

List of compositions

References

Sources
 Verdebout, Luc (1993). "Guillaume Lekeu. Correspondance. Introduction, Chronologie, et Catalogue des œuvres". 496pp. Liège: Pierre Mardaga. . (Includes complete catalogue of compositions and manuscripts (including unfinished fragments and sketchbooks) with incipits and detailed descriptions, p357 et seq.)

External links
 IMSLP List of selected works by Guillaume Lekeu with links to free downloadable scores

Lekeu, Guillaume, compositions by